The Ostrava Open (currently known as the AGEL Open for sponsorship reasons) is a tennis tournament organised for female professional tennis players. It is currently a WTA 500-level tournament held in October, played on indoor hard courts, and first organised in 2020 for over 20 years to make up for the many tournaments cancelled during the 2020 season, due to the ongoing COVID-19 pandemic. 

From 1994 to 1998, the Czech Indoor was a men's tennis tournament that was part of the World Series of the ATP Tour. It was held at the ČEZ Aréna in Ostrava in the Czech Republic and was played on indoor carpet courts.

In 1999, the Nokia Cup was a WTA Tour tournament. It was held in Prostějov in the Czech Republic and played on indoor carpet courts.

Women's results

Singles

Doubles

Men's results

Singles

Doubles

References

External links
Official website
 
Carpet court tennis tournaments
Indoor tennis tournaments
ATP Tour
Sport in Ostrava
Defunct tennis tournaments in the Czech Republic
 
Hard court tennis tournaments
WTA Tour